The Crown Prince of Tonga is the heir to the throne of Tonga.

The Article 32 of the Constitution of Tonga provides for male-preference primogeniture, meaning that the eldest son of the King automatically succeeds to the crown upon the monarch's death, and that the eldest daughter may succeed to the crown only if she has no living brothers and no deceased brothers who left surviving legitimate descendants.

The current Crown Prince of Tonga is Tupoutoʻa ʻUlukalala, who became heir apparent to the throne on 18 March 2012 upon the accession of his father, Tupou VI, as King.

Succession to George Tupou I
The long reign of the first King of Tonga, George Tupou I, saw six different heirs apparent to the Tongan throne. The only legitimate son of the King, Vuna Takitakimālohi, died unmarried in January 1862, leaving the King without an heir. The succession would remain vacant for thirteen years until the promulgation of the Constitution of Tonga in 1875, which legitimized Vuna's half-brother Tēvita ʻUnga and named him Crown Prince. By 1889, the King would outlive ʻUnga and all three of his grandchildren (ʻUelingatoni Ngū, Nalesoni Laifone and ʻElisiva Fusipala Taukiʻonetuku). That left his great-grandson Tāufaʻāhau (Fusipala's son) as the next Crown Prince who would succeed his great-grandfather in 1893 as George Tupou II.

Crown Princes of Tonga (1845–present)

See also
Succession to the Tongan throne

References

Bibliography

Crown Prince
Tonga
Crown Prince
1845 establishments in Tonga